Saqqavaz (also Romanized as Saqqāvāz; also known as Sa‘d Vaqqāş and Sakavas) is a village in Sanjabad-e Shomali Rural District, in the Central District of Kowsar County, Ardabil Province, Iran. At the 2006 census, its population was 462, in 73 families.

References 

Tageo

Towns and villages in Kowsar County